"Baby (You've Got What It Takes)" is a 1950s song written by Clyde Otis and Murray Stein.

Originally titled "You've Got What It Takes", the song was first recorded by Brook Benton's sister, Dorothy Pay, in 1958, as the B-side of her single "Strollin' with My Baby" on Mercury 71277.  In August 1959, Brook Benton partnered with Dinah Washington to record the song as "BABY, You've Got What It Takes".  Their version, released in January 1960, was hugely successful on both the pop and R&B charts, reaching #5 on the Billboard Hot 100 and #1 on the Hot R&B sides chart for ten weeks, becoming one of the most successful R&B singles of the 1960s.  The song was also featured on their 1960 duet album, The Two of Us.

Charts

Dinah Washington and Brook Benton

Later versions
Jerry Lee Lewis and his sister, Linda Gail Lewis recorded a duet version on a 1965 single.
Charlie Louvin and Melba Montgomery recorded a duet version on their 1971 album, Baby, You've Got What It Takes, with the single peaking at #30 on the country charts.
Kevin Mahogany included it as a duet with Jeanie Bryson in his 1995 album You Got What It Takes.
Martha Davis and Ivan Neville recorded a version in 1996 for the film A Smile Like Yours, starring Greg Kinnear and Joan Cusack.
Van Morrison and Linda Gail Lewis recorded a duet version on their 2000 album, You Win Again.
Nellie McKay's version with Taj Mahal in the soundtrack of the 2005 movie Rumor Has It....
Michael Bublé's recording (featuring Sharon Jones & The Dap-Kings) from his 2009 album, Crazy Love was featured during season 6 (week 4) of So You Think You Can Dance.

References

1960 singles
Brook Benton songs
Dinah Washington songs
Anne Murray songs
Jerry Lee Lewis songs
Linda Gail Lewis songs
Van Morrison songs
Male–female vocal duets
1958 songs
Songs written by Clyde Otis
Mercury Records singles